Striped squirrel may refer to the following:

 African striped squirrel (genus Funisciurus)
 Asiatic striped squirrel (genus Tamiops)
 black-striped squirrel (Callosciurus nigrovittatus)

See also
 List of rodents

Squirrels
Animal common name disambiguation pages